was an admiral in the Imperial Japanese Navy during World War II, remembered for his extensive and revealing war diary, role at the Battle of Leyte Gulf, and kamikaze suicide hours after the announced surrender of Japan at the end of the war.

Biography

Early career
Born to a farming family in rural Akaiwa District, Okayama (now part of Okayama city, Okayama prefecture), Ugaki entered the Imperial Japanese Naval Academy on 11 September 1909 and graduated in its 40th class on 17 July 1912. He placed ninth out of 144 cadets in his class, and was good friends with his Naval Academy classmates Tamon Yamaguchi and Yoshio Suzuki, both of whom were killed in action during World War II. He served as a midshipman on the armored cruiser  and made a training cruise to Australia aboard her.

On 1 May 1913, he was transferred to the protected cruiser  and was commissioned as ensign on 1 December 1913.  He was assigned to the battlecruiser  on 27 May 1914.

World War I
Japan entered World War I on the side of the Allies on 23 August 1914. During the early weeks of the war, Ibuki, with Ugaki aboard, participated in the Allied search for the Imperial German Navy light cruiser  in the Indian Ocean, joined the Royal Navy armoured cruiser  and protected cruiser  in escorting a convoy carrying the main body of the New Zealand Expeditionary Force from New Zealand across the Tasman Sea and to Albany, Western Australia, and along with the Royal Australian Navy light cruiser  escorted a convoy carrying the Australian and New Zealand Army Corps across the Indian Ocean from Australia to the Middle East. Ugaki was promoted to sub-lieutenant on 1 December 1915 while aboard Ibuki.

Ugaki subsequently transferred to the battlecruiser  on 1 December 1916. Kongō experimented with handling airplanes and operated off China during his tour. On 10 September 1917, he reported aboard the armored cruiser , and aboard her made a training cruise in company with the armored cruiser  to the west coast of North America with the Japanese Naval Academy′s 45th class aboard between 2 March and 6 July 1918. He was reassigned to the destroyer  on 1 August 1918, and was aboard her when the war ended on 11 November 1918.

Interwar
After his promotion to lieutenant on 1 December 1918, Ugaki attended the Naval Gunnery School, and subsequently was assigned as chief gunnery officer to the destroyer  on 1 December 1919 before returning to  Kongō on 1 December 1921 as secondary gunnery officer. During his tour aboard her, Kongō operated off Dairen and Tsingtao, China, and St. Vladimir Bay, Russia, and visited Chinhae, Korea.

On 1 December 1922, Ugaki entered the Japanese . In 1924, he graduated in its 22nd class, and on 1 December 1924 he was promoted to lieutenant commander and began a stint as gunnery officer aboard the light cruiser . On 1 December 1925, he became a staff officer on the Imperial Japanese Navy General Staff and served for nearly three years as a staff member of the Naval Gunnery School. On 15 November 1928 he was appointed as a resident officer in Germany, and he was promoted to commander on 10 December 1928.

Ordered back to Japan on 1 November 1930, Ugaki returned to sea in an assignment as a staff officer in the 3rd Cruiser Division on 1 December 1930, and then became a staff officer in the 2nd Fleet on 1 December 1931. Ugaki became an instructor at the Naval War College on 15 November 1932 and received a promotion to captain on 1 December 1932. On 30 October 1935, Ugaki was assigned to duty as a staff officer to the Combined Fleet, then received his first command on 1 December 1936 as commanding officer of the training ship , From 7 June to 19 October 1937, Yakumo made a training cruise to Suez and the Mediterranean under his command with the 64th class of the Japanese Naval Academy embarked. On 1 December 1937, he took command of the battleship , which operated as part of the Japanese blockade of the southern coast of China during the Second Sino-Japanese War.

Ugaki was promoted to rear admiral on 15 November 1938 and became Director, 1st Bureau (Operations) on the Naval General Staff on 15 December 1938. In August 1941, Ugaki was appointed Chief-of-Staff of the Combined Fleet under Admiral Isoroku Yamamoto, a position he held until Yamamoto's death.

World War II
The Pacific campaign of World War II began with the Japanese attack on Pearl Harbor, Hawaii, on 7 December 1941 (8 December 1941 on the other side of the International Date Line in Japan), and Ugaki was promoted to vice admiral on 1 November 1942.  Ugaki and Yamamoto were traveling in separate Mitsubishi G4M (Allied reporting name "Betty") bombers when United States Army Air Forces fighters shot down both aircraft over Bougainville in the Solomon Islands on 18 April 1943 in what the United States named "Operation Vengeance". Yamamoto was killed, his aircraft crashing in the jungle, while Ugaki′s plane fell into the sea at high speed. Ugaki was one of three survivors, the others being the bomber's pilot, Flight Petty Officer 2nd Class Hiroshi Hayashi, and another staff officer, Captain Motoharu Kitamura. On 22 May 1943, the injured Ugaki was attached to the Naval General Staff for hospitalization.

After U.S. forces landed on Biak on 27 May 1944, he argued forcefully that Japan had a strategic imperative to hold Biak, and at least partially as a result of his advocacy the Imperial Japanese Navy planned Operation Kon for the relief of the island and on 30 May 1944 created the Kon Force to carry out the operation. It gave Ugaki additional duty as overall commander of the Kon Force on 10 June 1944, and the Kon Force got underway from Tawi-Tawi in the Philippine Islands  that day. but the operation was postponed on 12 June 1944 when the Marianas campaign began with the first U.S. bombardments of Saipan. Battleship Division 1 joined the Van Force of the Mobile Force as it deployed for the defense of the Mariana Islands. In the resulting Battle of the Philippine Sea Ugaki's battleships exchanged fire with U.S. Navy carrier aircraft while defending Japanese aircraft carriers on 20 June 1944 and emerged unscathed except for a strafing attack on Nagato. Operation Kon was canceled. 

Ugaki subsequently commanded Battleship Division 1 during the disastrous Battle of Leyte Gulf of 23–26 October 1944. His battleships saw action in two major engagements of the battle, the Battle of the Sibuyan Sea on 24 October 1944, in which U.S. aircraft sank Musashi, and the Battle off Samar on 25 October 1944. In the latter action, Yamato and Nagato, the largest battleships in the Imperial Japanese Navy, inflicted only modest damage on United States Navy forces despite their tremendous firepower.

On 15 November 1944, Ugaki was recalled to Japan and ordered to duty with the Naval General Staff. On 10 February 1945, he was appointed commander of the 5th Air Fleet, based in Kyūshū and overseeing all naval aircraft in the region from his headquarters in a cave bunker to protect him from the growing threat of U.S. Army Air Forces B-29 Superfortress attacks. In March 1945, he launched a long-range strike by kamikaze aircraft against the U.S. fleet anchored at Ulithi Atoll. After the Battle of Okinawa began on 1 April 1945, he ordered the first waves of Operation Kikusui ("Chrysanthemum Water"), which involved hundreds of kamikaze attacks against U.S. Navy ships in the vicinity of Okinawa during April 1945. Though such air attacks continued throughout the Okinawa campaign and caused fearsome superficial damage and crew casualties to a great number of Allied vessels, no Allied warship larger than a destroyer were sunk directly by kamikazes during the spring of 1945.

Meanwhile, Ugaki gathered more aircraft and hid them from Allied attack in Kyushu, planning to use them in kamikaze attacks during the expected Allied invasion of Japan. Ugaki planned to hit the invasion forces with hundreds of aircraft and Shin'yō suicide attack motorboats over the course of a few hours in Operation Ketsu-Go (Decisive Operation).

Final mission

On 15 August 1945, Emperor Hirohito made a radio announcement conceding defeat and calling for the military to lay down their arms. After listening to the announcement of Japan's defeat, Ugaki made a last entry in his diary noting that he had not yet received an official cease-fire order, and that as he alone was to blame for the failure of his valiant aviators to stop the enemy, he would fly one last mission himself to show the true spirit of bushido. His subordinates protested, and even after Ugaki had climbed into the backseat of a Yokosuka D4Y (Allied reporting name "Judy") dive bomber piloted by Captain Tatsuo Nakatsuru, Warrant Officer Akiyoshi Endo—whose place in the kamikaze roster Ugaki had usurped—climbed into the same space that the admiral had already occupied. Thus, the aircraft containing Ugaki took off with three men (piloted by Captain Tatsuo Nakatsuru, reconnaissance by Flight Sergeant Akiyoshi Endo, and Ugaki), as opposed to two each in the remaining ten aircraft. Prior to boarding his aircraft, Ugaki posed for pictures and removed his rank insignia from his dark green uniform, taking only a ceremonial short sword given to him by Admiral Yamamoto.

Elements of this last flight most likely followed the Ryukyu flyway southwest to the many small islands north of Okinawa, where U.S. forces were still on alert at the potential end of hostilities. Endo served as radioman during the mission, sending Ugaki's final messages, the last of which at 19:24 reported that the plane had begun its dive onto an American vessel. However, U.S. Navy records do not indicate any successful kamikaze attack on that day, and it is likely that all aircraft on the mission (with the exception of three that returned due to engine problems) crashed into the ocean, struck down by American anti-aircraft fire. Although there are no precise accounts of an intercept made by Navy or Marine fighters or Pacific Fleet surface units against enemy aircraft in this vicinity at the time of surrender, it is possible further research may reveal more detail as to which ships (if any) were attacked. According to one report this last flight of seven aircraft was shot down by American landing craft LST-926.

The next morning, the crew of LST-926 claimed to have found the still smoldering remains of a "cockpit" (implying a shootdown or violent ditching of some sort, but not the exact cause) with three bodies on the beach of Iheyajima Island. The third man, his head crushed and right arm missing, wore a dark green uniform and a short sword was found nearby. The sailors buried the bodies in the sand. He was posthumously awarded the Grand Cordon of the Order of the Rising Sun.

Honors and awards
  Order of the Rising Sun 1st Class, Grand Cordon (posthumous, ca. 1945)

References

Footnotes

Bibliography

  
Thomas, Evan (2007), Sea of Thunder:  Four Naval Commanders and the Last Sea War, New York:  Simon and Schuster.

External links

Bio at World War II Database

1890 births
1945 deaths
People from Okayama
Imperial Japanese Navy admirals
Japanese military personnel killed in World War II
Japanese admirals of World War II
Kamikaze pilots
Japanese naval attachés
Japanese diarists
Grand Cordons of the Order of the Rising Sun
20th-century diarists